Kurt Welsch (21 June 1917 – 14 October 1981) was a German international footballer.

References

1917 births
1981 deaths
Association football defenders
German footballers
Germany international footballers
Borussia Neunkirchen players